Prosoplus bakewellii is a species of beetle in the family Cerambycidae. It was described by Francis Polkinghorne Pascoe in 1859.

References

Prosoplus
Beetles described in 1859